Louis Robert Eliot (born  11 April 1968 in Plymouth) is an English singer, songwriter and guitarist, formerly of Kinky Machine and Rialto.

Biography 
Eliot formed Rialto in 1995 with former Kinky Machine bandmate Johnny Bull. The band achieved UK chart success with two  UK top 40 hits ("Monday Morning 5.19" and "Dream Another Dream") and a UK Top 20 ("Untouchable") in the late Nineties. They found particular success in Asia where their debut album achieved double platinum status in South Korea. Rialto made numerous UK television appearances including Top of the Pops and TFI Friday. Due to changing label personnel, the band were signed and dropped twice by Warner Records, causing delays to the release of both albums "Rialto" and "Night On Earth".  

In 2002, Eliot released his first solo EP, "Everybody Loves You When You're Dead". A chance meeting with ex-Roxy Music member and Smiths producer John Porter led to recording sessions in Los Angeles. These became the basis for Eliot's first critically acclaimed solo album, The Long Way Round, released in 2004 (Sunday Times' Album of the Week). In 2010 he released Kittows Moor under the name Louis Eliot and The Embers which was described as "A winning blend of rustic charm and urban cool… a savvy pop brain with the lyrical articulacy of a Costello or a Weller." by Uncut, and "an album that boasts ultra-friendly, individually shaped songs, guaranteed to warm both hearts and feet" by Mojo. As a solo artist, he has toured with Sinead O'Connor, Thea Gilmore, Lloyd Cole, Robyn Hitchcock and The Proclaimers. As a session musician Eliot has backed Skye Edwards from Morcheeba, Evan Dando of The Lemonheads and Danny Goffey from Supergrass. Since 2011, Eliot has toured extensively as a full time member of Grace Jones's band.  

As a songwriter Eliot's credits include Eg White's solo album, "Adventure Man" ("Weird Friendless Kid" was also recorded by Emiliana Torrini), Tommy Mclain ("London Too"),  Lily Allen ("Shelter You") and Liz Cass ("Confessional").  Eliot has featured in advertising campaigns for Burberry with Kate Moss, Dunhill, Toast and Balanciaga with Charlotte Gainsbourg. In 2013 he appeared in Katy England's short film "Made in England".  His music has been used in TV commercials for The Guardian and UPS.

Personal life 
As a child, Eliot was taught guitar by Hawkwind guitarist Huw Lloyd-Langton. He attended Chelsea School of Art and studied Graphic Design at Sir John Cass in London. As a director of Port Eliot Festival - (which ran from 2003 to 2019) - Eliot's multi-faceted roll included creative direction and bookings. He was instrumental in developing the programming and transforming a small literary festival into a popular arts event, that attracted 8,000 people and included music, fashion, film, comedy and gastronomy. 

As co-founder of "Kernow in the City", Eliot showcased Cornish talent at live events in London.

Eliot lives in London and performs with Grace Jones and former Supergrass drummer Danny Goffey on his solo venture. He is a first cousin of oscar-winning composer Atticus Ross (also of band Nine Inch Nails), producer Leopold Ross and model Liberty Ross.

Discography
Everybody Loves You When You're Dead (2002)
The Long Way Round (2004) 
Kittow's Moor (2010) (Fullfill)

Sources

External links
Official homepage

Living people
1968 births
English male singer-songwriters
English rock guitarists
English male guitarists
Younger sons of earls
Louis Eliot
Britpop musicians
Alumni of Chelsea College of Arts